Abramkovo is a rural locality (a settlement) in Verkhnetoyemsky District, Arkhangelsk Oblast, Russia. The population was 89 as of 2010. There is 1 street.

Geography 
Abramkovo is located on the Severnaya Dvina River, 23 km south of Verkhnyaya Toyma (the district's administrative centre) by road. Yazinets is the nearest rural locality.

References 

Rural localities in Verkhnetoyemsky District